Katarzyna Kawa and Tereza Mihalíková were the defending champions but Mihalíková chose not to participate. 

Kawa partnered alongside Elvina Kalieva and successfully defended her title, defeating Giuliana Olmos and Marcela Zacarías in the final, 6–1, 3–6, [10–2].

Seeds

Draw

Draw

References

External Links
Main Draw

Rancho Santa Fe Open - Doubles